Kisinoti Munodei Mukwazhe (also spelled Kisnot Mukwazhi) (died 17 November 2019) was president of the Zimbabwe Development Party and was a presidential candidate for the 2013 Zimbabwean general election.

References

2019 deaths
Zimbabwean politicians
Year of birth missing